Western Conference or West Conference or variation, may refer to:

Basketball
 Western Conference (NBA), one of the two conferences of the National Basketball Association
 Western Conference (WNBA), one of the two conferences of the Women's National Basketball Association

Hockey
 Western Conference (KHL), one of two conferences of the Kontinental Hockey League
 Western Conference (NHL), one of the two conferences of the National Hockey League

Soccer
 Western Conference (MLS), one of two conferences of Major League Soccer
 Western Conference (USL), one of United Soccer League's two conferences

Other
 Eastern and Western Conferences (NFL) 1933–69, succeeded by NFC North and NFC West
 Western Conference (RHI), one of the two conferences of the Roller Hockey International
 Western Athletic Conference, an NCAA Division I college athletic conference in the U.S.
 Western State Conference, affiliated with California Community College Athletic Association
 One of the historical names of Big Ten Conference, a college athletic conference in the U.S.
 Western Conference on Linguistics, an annual conference on Linguistics

See also

 Western Football Conference (disambiguation)
 West Central Conference (disambiguation)
 
 
 
 Conference
 Western (disambiguation)
 West (disambiguation)